Devi Muka (born 21 December 1976 in Vlorë) is an Albanian retired footballer who has spent the majority of his career playing for KF Tirana in the Albanian Superliga as a midfielder.

Club career

Early career and Croatia
Muka started his career in 1993 with hometown club, Flamurtari Vlorë. He played for them until 1997 when he transferred to Partizani Tirana. He had played 77 league games at Flamurtari Vlorë and had scored 9 goals before leaving. At Partizani Tirana he made 28 appearances and scored 8 goals, and he subsequently moved to play for SK Tirana. In his first season with SK Tirana he played 23 times and scored 9 goals. He then moved to NK Varteks in Croatia, and after 3 years and 66 league games Muka moved back to Albania. He scored 4 goals during his time in Croatia.

Return to Albania
Muka returned to Albania in 2002 with SK Tirana. He played 23 games and scored 3 goals during the campaign, he scored against former club NK Varteks in the UEFA Champions League. Muka suffered an injury during the 2007–08 season that limited him to just 3 league games all season. In the 2008–09 season Muka did not play until October. He made his season debut on 19 October 2008 against bitter rivals, Dinamo Tirana when he came on for goalscorer Migen Memelli in the 72nd minute. Overall during the 2008–09 season he played 14 games and scored 3 goals, all 3 of them were scored at home at the Selman Stërmasi stadium. Muka once again lifted the trophy at the end of the season following a 2–1 win over title rivals Vllaznia Shkodër.

International career
Muka made his Albania National Team debut in a friendly against Cyprus on 19 August 1998. He came on for goalscorer Alban Bushi in the 76th minute of the game. The match resulted in a 3–2 loss for Albania. Muka was 21 when he made his debut. Muka's first and only international goal came on 4 September 1999 Euro 2000 Qualifying match against Latvia. He came off the bench on the 78th minute replacing Igli Tare. His goal came in the 91st minute of the game which secured a point for Albania. He was recalled to the squad when Otto Baric took charge of Albania after having a year gap with no international involvement. Muka last played for the national team on 17 October 2007 in a Euro 2008 Qualifying match against Bulgaria. He replaced Altin Haxhi at half time. The match ended in a 1–1 draw after Ervin Skela missed from the penalty spot on the 90th minute. In total Muka made 40 appearances for the Albania National Team and scored one goal from 1998 to 2007.

International goals
Scores and results list Albania's goal tally first.

Career statistics

Club

International

Managerial career 
Muka was immediately named as manager of KF Tirana following the departure of Nevil Dede after just two games in charge. The attacking midfielder was still eligible to play for the club and this meant that he became the first Player Manager in the 2009-10 Albanian Superliga. Muka signed his first managerial contract on the day of Dede's departure on 9 February 2010.

Notes

References

External links
 Profile at playerhistory.com

1976 births
Living people
Footballers from Vlorë
Albanian footballers
Association football midfielders
Albania international footballers
Albania under-21 international footballers
Flamurtari Vlorë players
FK Partizani Tirana players
KF Tirana players
NK Varaždin players
Kategoria Superiore players
Albanian expatriate footballers
Expatriate footballers in Croatia
Albanian expatriate sportspeople in Croatia
Albanian football managers
KF Tirana managers
Kategoria Superiore managers